The Nisei Veterans Memorial Center (Nisei Taiekigunjin Kinen Sentā) is a non-profit organization, memorial, and community center, dedicated to Japanese American nisei veterans. It is located on Kahului, Hawaii and features educational exhibits, a preschool, and an adult daycare. The main building was built in 2006.

History
The organization was incorporated in 1991. During 2003, the Maui Sons and Daughters of Nisei veterans completed plans and research into the construction of the center, which would consist of a preschool, a senior day-care center, and a research center/archive.

Wings

Kansha Preschool
The center includes a pre-school, and they enroll up to 16 children. Children interact daily with the elderly at the adult-day care center that they share a facility with.

Adult day-care center
The Nisei Veterans Memorial Center includes the Oceanview branch of the Maui Adult Day Care Centers.

Education center
The education center began construction on 29 June 2009. It opened in 2013, and contains a classroom, a pavilion, and an archive containing "oral histories from the veterans ... photographs, documents, and personal scrapbooks".

See also 
 Japanese Cultural Center of Hawaii
 Hawaii United Okinawa Association
 Japanese in Hawaii

References

External links
 

Buildings and structures in Maui County, Hawaii
Japanese-American memorials
Japanese-American culture in Hawaii
Monuments and memorials in Hawaii
World War II memorials in the United States
History of Maui